Trimethylolethane (TME) is the organic compound with the formula CH3C(CH2OH)3. This colorless solid is a triol, as it contains three hydroxy functional groups. More specifically, it features three primary alcohol groups in a compact neopentyl structure. Its esters are known for their resistance to heat, light, hydrolysis, and oxidation. More important than TME and closely related is trimethylolpropane (TMP).

Production
Trimethylolethane is produced via a two step process, starting with the condensation reaction of propionaldehyde with formaldehyde:
CH3CH2CHO  +  2 CH2O   →  CH3C(CH2OH)2CHO
The second step entails a Cannizzaro reaction:
CH3C(CH2OH)2CHO  + CH2O  + NaOH  →   CH3C(CH2OH)3 +  NaO2CH
A few thousand tons are produced annually in this way.

Applications
TME is an intermediate in the production of alkyd and polyester resins, powder coating resins, synthetic lubricants based on polyol esters, stabilizers for plastics, plasticizers, and pigment coatings based on titanium dioxide. Trimethylolethane based resins have superior weatherability and resistance to alkali and heat. Trimethylolethane is used in some phase change materials. The typical composition is then 63 wt.% TME with 37 wt.% water. The mixture has melting point of 29.8 °C and heat of fusion 218 kJ/kg.  Nitration of trimethylolethane gives trimethylolethane trinitrate, an explosive, monopropellant, and energetic plasticizer.

See also
 Pentaerythritol
 Neopentyl glycol
 Trimethylolpropane

References

External links
 MSDS
 TME

Triols